Frederick Marx is a film producer/director/writer. He was named a Chicago Tribune Artist of the Year for 1994, a 1995 Guggenheim Fellow, and a recipient of a Robert F. Kennedy Special Achievement Award. Frederick Marx achieved international fame for a film he co-wrote, Hoop Dreams with Steve James, the director of the film. It is one of the highest grossing non-musical documentaries in United States history.

Career
Frederick Marx is a producer, director, writer, and editor with 35 years in the film business, most of them as an independent filmmaker. Having worked for a time as an English and creative writing teacher, Marx began his movie career as a film critic, and has worked both as a film distributor and exhibitor.

Marx graduated from the University of Illinois Laboratory High School in Urbana, Illinois in 1973.

With a B.A. in Political Science and an MFA in filmmaking from Southern Illinois University at Carbondale, Marx has coupled his formal education with a natural gift for languages, speaking German and some Mandarin-Chinese. His interest in languages and foreign cultures is reflected in PBS' international human rights program Out of the Silence (1991), the widely acclaimed personal essay Dreams from China (1989), and Learning Channel's Saving the Sphinx (1997). He consulted on Iranian-Kurdish director Bahman Ghobadi's feature Turtles Can Fly (2004) and was a teacher of renowned Thai feature filmmaker Apichatpong Weerasethakul.

In 1993, Marx received an Emmy nomination for Higher Goals (1992) for Best Daytime Children's Special.Producer, Director, and Writer for this national PBS Special, Marx directed Tim Meadows of Saturday Night Live fame. Accompanied by a curriculum guide, the program was later distributed for free to over 4,200 inner city schools nationwide. The Unspoken (1999), Marx's first feature film, features performances from Russian star Sergei Shnirev of the famed Moscow Art Theatre, and Harry Lennix.

Three of Marx's films premiered at the New York Film Festival. Having dedicated his life to the making and promotion of independent films, Marx repeatedly returns to work with disadvantaged and misunderstood communities: people of color, abused children, the working poor, welfare recipients, prisoners, the elderly, at-risk youth, and American veterans. His films show a passion for appreciating multiculturalism and an urgent empathy for the sufferings of the disadvantaged to every subject he tackles.

Hoop Dreams (1994) is the film that first interested Marx in the welfare of teenage boys. Boys to Men? (2004), distributed by Media Education Foundation, takes that as its central theme. Boys Become Men, now in production, is the sequel, pinpointing initiation and mentorship as the solutions to the problems teen boys face.

A hobbyist songwriter, in 1991 Marx recorded a number of his songs collectively known as Rolling Steel. Two of those 11 songs are used over The Unspoken (1999) tail credits and one is used in Boys to Men.

Hoop Dreams (1994)
Frederick Marx's film Hoop Dreams played in hundreds of theatres nationwide after winning the Audience Award at the Sundance Film Festival and was the first documentary ever chosen to close the New York Film Festival. It was on over 100 "Ten Best" lists nationwide and was named Best Film of the Year by Roger Ebert. Ebert also named it Best Film of the Decade.  It was named the Best Documentary of All Time by the International Documentary Association. In 2005 it was added to the US Library of Congress’s National Film Registry. It won many major international awards – the Producers Guild of America (PGA), the Motion Picture Editors Guild (MPEG), the Peabody Award, the National Society of Film Critics (NSFC),  Prix Italia, and the Robert F. Kennedy Special Achievement Award.

Though Marx was nominated for editing Hoop Dreams by the Academy of Motion Picture Arts and Sciences (Oscars), the film itself was never nominated as Best Film or Best Documentary, which caused something of a scandal and led the Academy to rewrite its nominating procedures.

Journey From Zanskar (2010)
Journey From Zanskar tells the emotional story of 17 small children who leave home and family, possibly forever, in order to save their dying Tibetan culture.  Parting from one of the most remote and desolate places on Earth – Zanskar, in northwest India –  the expedition must travel on foot over 17,000 foot Himalayan passes.  The two monks serving as guides walked this same path 30 years ago when they were children. Written, produced, and directed by Frederick Marx, narrated by Richard Gere, featuring the Dalai Lama, the film tells the story of their incredible journey. Distributed in France by Jupiter films, Frederick Marx is currently self-distributing Journey From Zanskar in the United States through his non-profit company Warrior Films.

Rites of Passage - short film (2015)
An estimated $500 billion is spent yearly on teen dysfunctions: drug and alcohol abuse, teen pregnancy and STDs, school dropouts and expulsions, gang and property crimes, traffic accidents, ADD, ADHD, depression and violence. Teenagers unconsciously push up against the confines of their own bodies, the rules of parents and society, and the capacity of their own minds and willpower to discover the true limits of their potential. The film explains how they need to be initiated into adulthood and the social benefits that will accrue.

Rites of Passage - the feature (in production)
The film will show us how historically all major cultures and religions have had their own rites of passage. The film will show us the price we pay as a society for not initiating our teens. Communities are answering the call by co-creating their own functional rites of passage today. We will see real families who’ve been struck by the horrors and crimes of youth and how they’re repairing themselves and their neighborhoods. Finally, it will not only show us teens themselves who’ve been transformed by rites of passage, but how their metamorphosis has revolutionized their relations with family and friends, teachers and bosses, creating positive changes rippling across homes, schools, neighborhoods, workplaces, cities and farms across the planet.

Veterans Journey Home (in Production)
American veterans struggle to transition back to civilian life with PTSD, addiction, unemployment, domestic violence, homelessness, and suicide rates much higher than the general population. Focused on the daily struggles faced by men and women returning from combat, this documentary aims to help average citizens, veterans, and their families understand the multiple non-pathologizing, drug-free healing modalities available that offer veterans support and compassion. The film aims to highlight the best people, practices, and programs doing the necessary work sometimes referred to as "Reverse Boot Camp."

At Death Do Us Part  (2018)
Marx shares the history, depth and the power of his relationship with his wife Tracy Seeley (who had breast cancer when they met), the journey they traveled together to her ultimate death, and his subsequent odyssey through the grief.  He reflects on how his lifelong study of Buddhism (up to and including his being ordained as a Rinzai Zen Priest in the Hollow Bones Order), his work with the ManKind Project  and his studies in mature masculinity, and his Rites of Passage work, all helped pull him through.

Rites to a Good Life: Everyday Rituals for Healing and Transformation (2020) 
All our passages through a normal human life span deserve attention and ritual. Marx's latest book describes how we can do it simply, without great fuss, with minimal disruption to our normal lives, and without the need for priests, ministers, or gurus. This is not a religious book. All beliefs and non-beliefs are welcome.

Written in a no-nonsense style, this handbook offers many real-world ideas about how people can change to live a fulfilled daily life. Each chapter ends with a bullet-point list on "What You Can Do Now." Readers will leave with practical suggestions for living a more meaningful life each and every moment.

Interspersed throughout are anecdotes and reflections from a multi-cultural assembly of some of the most well-respected minds in human transformation: Robert Bly, Michael Meade, Meredith Little, Starhawk, Orland Bishop, Robert Moore, Bill Plotkin, Clarissa Pinkola-Estes, Angeles Arrien, Richard Louv.

Filmography
 Rites of Passage (feature film, in production)
 Surviving Home (2017) (Producer)
 The Tatanka Alliance (2015)
 The World As It Could Be (2014-2015)
 Journey From Zanskar (2010)
 Boys To Men? (2004) (documentary mini-series)
 The Unspoken (1999)
 The Mankind Project (MKP) Homecoming Chicago (1998)
 Saving the Sphinx (1997) (Learning Channel Special) (Exec. Producer, Producer)
 Joey Skaggs: Bullshit & Balls (1996)
 A Hoop Dreams Reunion (1995) (PBS-TV Special) (Producer, Editor, Talent)
 Hoop Dreams (1994) (Producer, Editor, Writer)
 Higher Goals (1992) (PBS-TV Special) (Producer, Editor, Talent)
 Inside/Out (1991) (play excerpt)
 Out of the Silence (1991) (Co-Producer, Editor)
 Hiding Out For Heaven (1989)
 House of Unamerican Activities (1984)
 Dream Documentary (1981)

Bibliography
 At Death Do Us Part: A Grieving Widower Attains Healing After the Loss of his Wife to Cancer (2018)
 Rites to a Good Life: Everyday Rituals of Healing and Transformation (2020)

References

External links 
 Frederick Marx at WarriorFilms.org
 
 
 Journey From Zanskar at WarriorFilms.org
 Rites of Passage at WarriorFilms.org
 At Death Do Us Part: A Grieving Widower Attains Healing After the Loss of his Wife to Cancer

American film directors
American film producers
American documentary filmmakers
Living people
1955 births
University Laboratory High School (Urbana, Illinois) alumni